Weerapat Doakmaiklee (born 13 June 1987) is a Thai former professional tennis player.

Tennis career
Born in Chon Buri, Doakmaiklee competed in the Australian Open as a junior and won 11 titles in doubles on the ITF Futures circuit. He reached a career high singles ranking of 680 while competing on the professional tour and was ranked as high as 319 in doubles.

Between 2007 and 2012 he appeared in a total of seven ties for the Thailand Davis Cup team. This includes a 2008 tie against Australia in Townsville, where he played a doubles rubber against Lleyton Hewitt.

Doakmaiklee was member of the gold medal winning men's team at the 2007 Southeast Asian Games, then in 2011 won a mixed doubles bronze medal at the University Games in Shenzhen. He has also represented Thailand at the Asian Games.

References

External links
 
 
 

1987 births
Living people
Weerapat Doakmaiklee
Weerapat Doakmaiklee
Tennis players at the 2010 Asian Games
Southeast Asian Games medalists in tennis
Weerapat Doakmaiklee
Weerapat Doakmaiklee
Competitors at the 2005 Southeast Asian Games
Competitors at the 2007 Southeast Asian Games
Universiade medalists in tennis
Universiade bronze medalists for Thailand
Medalists at the 2011 Summer Universiade
Weerapat Doakmaiklee
Weerapat Doakmaiklee